Leonid Dobroskokin (born 13 February 1952) is a Russian former swimmer. He competed in the men's 200 metre backstroke at the 1968 Summer Olympics for the Soviet Union.

References

1952 births
Living people
Russian male swimmers
Olympic swimmers of the Soviet Union
Swimmers at the 1968 Summer Olympics
Sportspeople from Voronezh
Soviet male swimmers